Barnabas Youwe Stadium is a multi-purpose stadium in Jayapura Regency, Papua, Indonesia. It is mainly used mostly for football matches.  The stadium has a capacity of 15,000 spectators.

References

Multi-purpose stadiums in Indonesia
Football venues in Indonesia
Buildings and structures in Papua (province)